South Moravian Innovation Centre (SIC) is an association of companies in Brno, Czech Republic that connects universities and research institutions with companies.

History 

SIC was founded in 2003. Notable members include South Moravian region, city of Brno, Masaryk University, Brno University of Technology, Mendel University and University of Veterinary and Pharmaceutical Sciences.

Activities 
SIC manages two technology incubators at Brno University of Technology and a biotechnological incubator in the university campus in Brno-Bohunice.

Companies which started in SIC include Y Soft, Safetica Technologies, Flowmon Networks, Sewio, Kiwi.com and FlowUp.

Awards 
SIC won 3rd place in national round of The Best Incubator Award 2011.

References

External links 
 South Moravian Innovation Centre

Business incubators of the Czech Republic
Business organizations based in the Czech Republic
Organizations established in 2003
Brno
Science and technology in the Czech Republic